Joseph Patrat or Patras (7 May 1733, Arles - 4 June 1801, Paris) was a French actor and playwright.

The son of a stagehand, he began his stage career in Berlin in 1755 and then acted in the Austrian Netherlands from 1756 to 1763, notably in Brussels in the company of the Théâtre de la Monnaie.  He then acted in Marseille and Geneva, where he also began to write plays.

Author of 40 plays, Patrat was also part of the company of Mademoiselle Montansier before establishing himself in Paris  and writing several pieces for the Comédie-Française, the Théâtre des Variétés-Amusantes, the Théâtre Montansier, the Théâtre de l'Ambigu-Comique, and above all for the Comédie-Italienne, the Théâtre du Palais-Royal, the Théâtre Feydeau and the Odéon.

Patrat's play "L'Heureuse Erreur" was published in 1783, and was then translated into English and adapted by Elizabeth Inchbald in 1786. Her version was titled "The Widow's Vow".

External links 
His plays and their productions on CESAR

1733 births
1801 deaths
People from Arles
French male stage actors
18th-century French dramatists and playwrights
18th-century French male actors